Burn Your Maps is a 2016 American comedy-drama film written and directed by Jordan Roberts, based on the short story of the same name by Robyn Joy Leff. The film stars Vera Farmiga, Jacob Tremblay, Suraj Sharma, Ramón Rodríguez, Virginia Madsen, and Marton Csokas.

The film had its world premiere at the 2016 Toronto International Film Festival on September 9, 2016, and was released on June 21, 2019, by Vertical Entertainment.

Plot
After the death of his infant sister, 8-year-old American boy Wes tells his grieving parents that he is a Mongolian goat-herder who was born in the wrong place. Joined by an ambitious young filmmaker named Ismail, Wes leads his family to Mongolia on a soul-searching journey.

Cast
 Vera Farmiga as Alise Firth
 Jacob Tremblay as Wes Firth
 Suraj Sharma as Ismail
 Virginia Madsen as Victoria
 Marton Csokas as Connor Firth
 Ramón Rodríguez as Batbayar
 Taylor Geare as Becca Firth
 Glynis Davies as Lillian
 Jason Scott Lee as Shaman Helper
 Nomin Bayasgalan as Enkhtuyaa
 Valerie Planche as Maureen

Production

Development
On June 18, 2015, it was reported that Julie Kirkham was to produce a feature film titled Burn Your Maps, written and directed by Jordan Roberts. The film was green-lit by producer Mark Canton a few days prior to Kirkham's death. Burn Your Maps is a feature film adaptation of author Robyn Joy Leff's short story of the same name. Canton and Courtney Solomon serve as producers under their Cinelou Films banner, with Patrick Aiello producing through his Patrick Aiello Productions. Jonathan Goldsmith composed the film's musical score.

Casting
The casting of Vera Farmiga, Virginia Madsen, Suraj Sharma, and Jacob Tremblay was reported on July 23, 2015. Marton Csokas' casting was confirmed near the end of production, on August 28, 2015.

Filming
Principal photography began in Calgary, Alberta, Canada on July 27, 2015,  and was completed on September 2, 2015. Filming took place in nearby Kananaskis Country, at the Stoney Indian Reserves, which doubled for Mongolia. Scenes were also filmed at the Eighth Avenue Place tower, which doubled for an American office space and for a Tokyo International Airport terminal. Over one hundred Calgary residents of Mongolian heritage were hired to act in minor roles.

Release
Burn Your Maps first screened at the 2016 Toronto International Film Festival on September 9, 2016, and had its red carpet premiere at the festival on September 15. It was initially scheduled for limited release on February 24, 2017, before expanding at a later date. The release date was subsequently pushed back to March 17, 2017, with a wide release following on March 24, 2017. However, it was ultimately pulled from the schedule.

Vertical Entertainment distributed the film in the United States. The film was distributed internationally by Warner Bros. Pictures as part of a six-film deal with Cinelou. It was released on June 21, 2019.

Critical reception
Burn Your Maps holds a 67% approval rating on review aggregator website Rotten Tomatoes, based on 15 reviews, with a weighted average of 7.04/10. On Metacritic, the film holds a rating of 50 out of 100, based on 8 critics, indicating "mixed or average".

Accolades

References

External links
 
 
 

2016 films
2010s coming-of-age comedy films
2010s road comedy-drama films
American coming-of-age comedy-drama films
American road comedy-drama films
Cinelou Films films
Films about children
Films about families
Films shot in Calgary
Films set in Chicago
Films set in Ohio
Films set in Mongolia
Warner Bros. films
2016 comedy films
2016 drama films
2010s English-language films
Films directed by Jordan Roberts
2010s American films